This is a list of full generals in the Nigerian Army. The rank of general (or full general to distinguish it from the lower general officer ranks) is the highest rank currently achievable by serving officers in the Nigerian Army. It is usually held by only the Chief of Defence Staff. It ranks above lieutenant-general and below field marshal which is only held as an honorary rank by the incumbent president of Nigeria in his capacity as the commander-in-chief of the Armed Forces of Nigeria.

Since 1960, only twelve officers have attained this rank. Among them, five attained this rank while they were head of state, one officer Sani Abacha attained this rank before becoming head of state. Eight of them served as Chief of Defence Staff, two heads of state (Sani Abacha and Abdulsalami Abubakar) also served as Chiefs of Defence Staff.

References

Nigerian generals
Nigerian Army full generals